Otto Piisinen (17 August 1885, Kuopion maalaiskunta – 15 August 1965) was a Finnish journalist and politician. He was a Member of the Parliament of Finland from 1913 to 1917, representing the Social Democratic Party of Finland (SDP). He belonged to the right wing of the party and, unlike most members of his party, sided with the Whites during the Finnish Civil War of 1918. Moving even further to the right, he was later active in the Patriotic People's Movement (IKL).

References

1885 births
1965 deaths
People from Kuopio
People from Kuopio Province (Grand Duchy of Finland)
Social Democratic Party of Finland politicians
Patriotic People's Movement (Finland) politicians
Members of the Parliament of Finland (1913–16)
Members of the Parliament of Finland (1916–17)
People of the Finnish Civil War (White side)
Finnish fascists